Rolando José Cedeño Morales (born 4 June 1971) is a Guatemalan former footballer.

Career statistics

International

References

1971 births
Living people
Sportspeople from Managua
Guatemalan footballers
Guatemalan expatriate footballers
Guatemala international footballers
Association football defenders
C.S.D. Municipal players
Deportivo Marquense players
Antigua GFC players
Guatemalan expatriate sportspeople in Mexico
Expatriate footballers in Mexico
Ascenso MX players